Najeebullah (born 1 January 1991) is a Pakistani cricketer. He made his List A debut on 16 January 2011, for the Lahore Lions in the 2010–11 One Day National Cup. He made his Twenty20 debut on 22 September 2014, also for the Lahore Lions, in the 2014–15 Haier T20 Cup. In October 2020, he was named in Balochistan's squad for the 2020–21 Quaid-e-Azam Trophy. He made his first-class debut on 3 November 2021, for Balochistan in the 2021–22 Quaid-e-Azam Trophy.

References

External links
 

1991 births
Living people
Pakistani cricketers
Balochistan cricketers
Lahore Lions cricketers
Place of birth missing (living people)